Abdur Rasheed Choudhury (1944 death) was a Bengali politician from Sylhet.

Career 
Chowdhury and Abdul Matin Chaudhary together established Minar Printing and Publishing Limited on 14 July 1932 which published the weekly newspaper Jugabheri. Before that, he worked as an Extra Assistant Commissioner in Sylhet. The editor of the newspaper was Moqbul Hussain Choudhury. Chowdhury was a tea planter and owned Sirajnagar tea garden. He also owned Hamdard Tea Company Limited and Dilkusha tea estate.

Chowdhury served in the Central Legislative Assembly of India in the 1940s representing Sylhet, Assam. He was independent from the Muslim block of Assam.

Personal life 
Choudhury was married to Begum Serajunnessa Choudhury (died 1974) when she was 16 as his second wife. He had three sons from his first marriage and seven from his second. His son, Humayun Rashid Choudhury (died 10 July 2001), was a diplomat and later the speaker of the Jatiya Sangsad (parliament of Bangladesh). His other son, Faruk Rashid Chowdhury, served as the Finance Minister of Bangladesh.

Children
He had 11 children, among them:
 Humayun Rasheed Chowdhury
 Faruk Rasheed Chowdhury
 Zeba Rasheed Chowdhury
 Jahanzeb Chowdhury

Death 
Choudhury died in 1944.

References 

1944 deaths
Bengali politicians
People from Sylhet Division